The Little Monocacy River is a  tributary stream of the Potomac River. Despite its name, the stream does not feed into the Monocacy River. The Little Monocacy is located almost entirely in Montgomery County, Maryland, and enters the Potomac just downstream from where the Monocacy enters the Potomac. Its headwaters rise southwest of Comus, and most of its approximately  watershed is farmland and pasture (60.56%) or forested land (36.03%).

See also
List of Maryland rivers

References

 Montgomery County Department of Environmental Protection. Rockville, MD. "The Little Monocacy, Furnace Branch, and Monocacy River Watersheds." Accessed 2010-04-24.

Rivers of Montgomery County, Maryland
Rivers of Maryland
Tributaries of the Potomac River